The Oliver and Gertrude Lundquist House on W. Thayer St. in Bismarck, North Dakota was listed on the National Register of Historic Places (NRHP) in 2006.  It has also been known as the George and Ada Ebert House.

It is a work of the Nonpartisan League's Home Building Association.

See also
Fred and Gladys Grady House, another work of the Nonpartisan League's Home Building Association, in Bismarck, and NRHP-listed

References

Houses on the National Register of Historic Places in North Dakota
Houses in Bismarck, North Dakota
National Register of Historic Places in Bismarck, North Dakota
Nonpartisan League